Andrew Jackson Ogle (March 25, 1822 – October 14, 1852) was a Whig member of the U.S. House of Representatives from Pennsylvania.

Andrew J. Ogle (son of Alexander Ogle, Jr., grandson of Alexander Ogle, and nephew of Charles Ogle) was born in Somerset, Pennsylvania, in 1822.  He attended Jefferson College in Canonsburg, Pennsylvania.  He studied law, was admitted to the bar in 1843 and commenced practice in Somerset.  He served as prothonotary of Somerset County, Pennsylvania, in 1845.

Ogle was elected as a Whig to the Thirty-first Congress.  He was an unsuccessful candidate for reelection in 1850.  He was appointed United States Chargé d'Affaires to Denmark on January 22, 1852, but did not assume his duties at that post.  He died in Somerset in 1852. Interment in Union Cemetery.

Sources

The Political Graveyard

1822 births
1852 deaths
People from Somerset, Pennsylvania
American people of English descent
Whig Party members of the United States House of Representatives from Pennsylvania
Ambassadors of the United States to Denmark
Pennsylvania lawyers
Pennsylvania prothonotaries
19th-century American diplomats
19th-century American lawyers
Washington & Jefferson College alumni